Sonoma Valley High School (SVHS) is a public high school located in Sonoma, California with approximately 1,300 students as of 2017. It was founded in 1891 and held its first commencement in 1894. It moved to its current campus in 1922. Since that time, there have been numerous additions to campus facilities. It is the only comprehensive high school in the Sonoma Valley Unified School District.

By some accounts, it is about the 25th oldest continuously operating high school in California.

Awards
Sonoma Valley was named a California Distinguished School in 1994.  The school student newspaper, the Sonoma Dragon's Tale, received first place in Overall Excellence in the Redwood Empire Excellence in Journalism Awards in 2013.  Editor-in-Chief Jamie Ballard and Copy Editor Grace Bon also received Outstanding Journalism awards in 2013.

Notable alumni
Tommy Everidge, former professional baseball player and current minor league hitting coach 
Brian Posehn, comedian and writer
Tony Moll, former professional football player
August Sebastiani, winery founder, named to Vintners Hall of Fame
Tim Schafer, computer game designer and founder of Double Fine
Max Simonet, co-creator and host of FishCenter Live on Adult Swim

David Ury, character actor and Japanese translation specialist

See also
 Education in the United States
 List of high schools in California

References

Buildings and structures in Sonoma, California
High schools in Sonoma County, California
Public high schools in California
Sonoma Valley